Mills House is a historic home located at Rome in Oneida County, New York. It is an eclectic High Victorian Gothic style brick residence built in 1877. It has a -story, gable-roofed main block and hip-roofed, square, brick kitchen wing.  It features a corner tower with pyramidal roof.

It was listed on the National Register of Historic Places in 1997.

References

Houses on the National Register of Historic Places in New York (state)
Gothic Revival architecture in New York (state)
Houses completed in 1877
Houses in Oneida County, New York
Rome, New York
National Register of Historic Places in Oneida County, New York
1877 establishments in New York (state)